Peru competed at the World Games 2017 in Wroclaw, Poland, from 20 July 2017 to 30 July 2017.

Competitors

Karate

Alexandra Grande won the gold medal in the women's kumite 61 kg event.

Muay Thai

Peru has qualified at the 2017 World Games:

Women's -60kg - 1 quota (Valentina Shevchenko)

References 

Nations at the 2017 World Games
2017 in Peruvian sport
2017